Bodrumspor is a Turkish football club located in Bodrum, Turkey.

History 
The club was founded under the name Bodrumspor in 1931 by Derviş Görgün, who was also a footballer for the club. They spent their early history as an amateur club before promoting to the TFF Third League in 1995. In the 2012-13 season with support from the Bodrum municipality, the club changed its name to Bodrum Belediyesi Bodrumspor, and again achieved promotion to the TFF Third League in the 2014-15 season.

Colours and badge 
The club colours were originally red and yellow, but are now green and white.

Current squad

Out on loan

Honours
TFF Third League: 2016–17
Turkish Regional Amateur League: 2014-15

References

External links 
 BB Bodrumspor Official website
 TFF Profile

Football clubs in Turkey
Association football clubs established in 1984
Sport in Muğla